Cross-country skiing at the 2018 Winter Olympics was held at the Alpensia Cross-Country Skiing Centre in Pyeongchang, South Korea. The twelve events took place between 10 and 25 February 2018.

Qualification

A maximum of 310 quota spots were available to athletes to compete at the games. A maximum of 20 athletes could be entered by a National Olympic Committee, with a maximum of 12 men or 12 women. There were two qualification standards for the games: an A standard and a B standard.

Competition schedule
The following was the competition schedule for all twelve events.

All times are (UTC+9).

Medal summary

Medal table

Men's events

Women's events

Participating nations
A total of 313 athletes from 65 nations (including the IOC's designation of Olympic Athletes from Russia) were scheduled to participate (the numbers of athletes are shown in parentheses).

References

External links
 Official Results Book – Cross-country skiing

 
2018 Winter Olympics
2018 Winter Olympics events
Olympics
Cross-country skiing competitions in South Korea